Eleutherodactylus eunaster is a species of frog in the family Eleutherodactylidae endemic to the Massif de la Hotte, Haiti. Its natural habitat is mesic hardwood closed-canopy forest at elevations of  asl. It is an arboreal species that is moderately common in suitable habitat. It is threatened by habitat loss primarily caused by logging for charcoaling and slash-and-burn agriculture. While the species occurs in the Pic Macaya National Park, there is no active management for conservation, and habitat loss continues also in the park.

References

eunaster
Endemic fauna of Haiti
Amphibians of Haiti
Amphibians described in 1973
Taxonomy articles created by Polbot